Vomeronasal type-1 receptor 3 is a protein that is encoded by the VN1R3 gene in humans.

References

Further reading 

 
 

G protein-coupled receptors